HMS Farnham Castle (K413) was a  of Britain's Royal Navy.

She was laid down at John Crown & Sons Ltd in Sunderland on 25 June 1943 and launched on 25 April 1944 before being commissioned on 31 January 1945

References

Publications

 

Castle-class corvettes
1944 ships
Ships built on the River Wear